Tasman is a region in the South Island of New Zealand. It contains numerous rural primary schools and several small town primary and secondary schools.

In New Zealand schools, students begin formal education in Year 1 at the age of five. Year 13 is the final year of secondary education. Years 14 and 15 refer to adult education facilities. 
State schools are those fully funded by the government and at which no fees for tuition of domestic students (i.e. New Zealand citizens and permanent residents, and Australian citizens) can be charged, although a donation is commonly requested. A state integrated school is a former private school with a special character based on a religious or philosophical belief that has been integrated into the state system. State integrated schools charge "attendance dues" to cover the building and maintenance of school buildings, which are not owned by the government, but otherwise they like state schools cannot charge fees for tuition of domestic students but may request a donation. Private schools charge fees to its students for tuition, as do state and state integrated schools for tuition of international students.

The socioeconomic decile indicates the socioeconomic status of the school's 'zone' (or catchment) area. A decile of 1 indicates the school draws from a poor area; a decile of 10 indicates the school draws from a well-off area. The decile ratings used here come from the Ministry of Education Te Kete Ipurangi website and from the decile change spreadsheet listed in the references. The deciles were last revised using information from the 2006 Census. The roll of each school changes frequently as students start school for the first time, move between schools, and graduate. The rolls given here are those provided by the Ministry of Education are based on figures from  The Ministry of Education institution number links to the Education Counts page for each school.

References
General
Te Kete Ipurangi Ministry of Education website
ERO school and early childhood education reports Education Review Office
Decile change 2007 to 2008 for state & state integrated schools

Specific

Tasman